Associazione Calcio Ponte San Pietro Società Sportiva Dilettantistica (usually referred to as Ponte San Pietro) is an Italian association football club located in Ponte San Pietro and also representing the towns of Terno d'Isola and Chignolo d'Isola, Lombardy. The club currently plays in Serie D.

History
Pontisola was founded in 1910 in the town of Ponte San Pietro as Società Sportiva Vita Nota and changed its denomination to Unione Sportiva Ponte San Pietro in 1950. The side spent the 1947–48 season in Serie B.

In 2007 the club, after the merger with F.C. Isola (representing the nearby towns of Terno d'Isola and Chignolo d'Isola), was renamed Unione Sportiva Ponte San Pietro Isola and later to the current one.

Colors and badge
Its colors are blue and white.

Honours
Regional Coppa Italia Lombardy:
Winner (1): 2006–07

Notable people
 

Riccardo Cerini (born 2000), professional football defender

References

 
Football clubs in Lombardy
Association football clubs established in 1910
Serie B clubs
Serie C clubs
Serie D clubs
1910 establishments in Italy